Sir Peter McLay Mills (22 September 1921 – 16 August 1993) was a Conservative Party politician in the United Kingdom. He served as a Member of Parliament (MP) for Torrington from 1964 to 1974, West Devon from 1974 to 1983 and Torridge and West Devon from 1983 to 1987. While an MP he served as Parliamentary Secretary to the Ministry of Agriculture and Fisheries in 1972, Parliamentary Under-Secretary of State for the Northern Ireland Office from 1972 to 1974, and was knighted for his work in 1982.

References

External links 
 

1921 births
1993 deaths
Conservative Party (UK) MPs for English constituencies
UK MPs 1964–1966
UK MPs 1966–1970
UK MPs 1970–1974
UK MPs 1974
UK MPs 1974–1979
UK MPs 1979–1983
UK MPs 1983–1987
Politicians awarded knighthoods
Northern Ireland Office junior ministers